Mosney Railway Station opened in June 1948 to serve Butlin's Holiday Camp in County Meath, Ireland and closed in the summer of 2000, the last season during which the camp operated.

See also
 List of railway stations in Ireland

References

External links
 Eiretrains - Mosney Station

Iarnród Éireann stations in County Meath
Railway stations in County Meath
Railway stations opened in 1948
Railway stations closed in 2000